Zhang Jie (27 April 1937 – 21 January 2022) was a Chinese novelist and short-story writer. In the meanwhile, she was also the co-author of a biography of the film director Wu Zuguang in 1986. She worked on writing different kinds of books for or with young protagonists, these types of works are included in junior and senior high school textbooks in China. She is one of China's first contributors to feminist fiction. In Zhang Jie's works, she mainly worked on the themes of "people" and "love",  she often emphasizes the emotions and relationships between mother and daughter, which was formed mainly by early poverty and the fierce protection of her mother. The Person Who loved me the most on earth is gone is the long story, which is a long self-statement recounting the last eighty days and nights of her mother's life, who died in 1991. She remembered her mother's submission, dependence and forbearance to her, and her consideration, complaint and regret to her mother. This novel is a simple and unpretentious expression of the love between mother and daughter.

Zhang Jie's novel Leaden Wings was translated into German in 1982 and published in England in 1987 by Virago Press. She was awarded the Mao Dun Literature Prize in 1985 for Leaden Wings and in 2005 for Without a Word, making her the first writer to receive the award twice. She is not only the only one writer who has won the Mao Dun Literature Price twice, but is also one of the most influential writers in contemporary China. Zhang Jie is a representative of female writers in contemporary China. In her words, she creates many female images with different life paths and destinies, and explores the situation of women in the contemporary China from her unique perspective.

Biography

Early life 
Zhang Jie was born in Beijing on April 27, 1937, and was raised up by her mother in a village in Fushun, in Liaoning Province. Zhang Jie was born in a modest civil-servant family. Her parents were separated when she was very young, and then she lived with her mother and took her mother's last name. Zhang Jie and her mother were dependent on each other and spent long, miserable years in the turbulent times. Her mother worked as a teacher in the village elementary school and was forced to work as a servant and a factory mail-woman. Zhangjie was fond of music and literature when She was in elementary school and middle school. In 1960, She graduated from the Department of Statistics in Renmin University of China (People's University), and went to work for the First Ministry of Machinery Industry. Zhang Jie married to a singer in the theatrical work unity and had a daughter called Tang Di, she and her husband got divorced in 1969. During the Cultural Revolution, she was sent to the "May 7 cadre school" and returned to Beijing in 1972 and back to work in the First Ministry of Machinery Industry. Zhang Jie has endured many pains in her personal life, she has supported a family of three generations of women for a long time with her strong perseverance.

After the Cultural Revolution, Zhang Jie finally started her literary work, she published her first novelThe Child of the Forest in 1978. Once published in Beijing Literature and Art, the novel immediately attracted the attention of the literary world, and won the Best Short Stories, this was her first entry into the literary world. In the following year, she published a number of short stories and joined the Chinese Writer's Association. Zhang Jie joined the Communist Party in 1980. The novel Leaden Wings published in April 1981, which immediately aroused strong reactions and controversies, and almost became a notable event in the literary world and the society. In 1982, she joined the International PEN China Center and accompanied a delegation of Chinese writers to the United States to attend the first Sino-American Writers' Conference, she was the vice chairman of the Beijing Writers' Association. She has visited and been invited countless times to hold readings of her works, lectures and press conferences in Berlin, Paris, Vienna and other parts of the world. Leaden Wings was reissued by the People's Literature Publishing House in July 1984 and was well received by the literary community and won the 2nd Mao Dun Literature Prize of 1985. Over the years, Zhang Jie's creative works have been very successful. From December 1984 to January 1985, Zhang Jie attended the Fourth Congress of the Chinese Writer's Association. By 1986, Zhang Jie was the first writer of the new period to win three national awards. Some of her works have been translated into foreign languages and distributed around the world.

Personal life and death 
Zhang Jie died in New York on January 21, 2022, at the age of 84.

Awards 
Best Short Stories of 1978 --- The Child of the Forest
Best Short Stories of 1979 --- Who Knows how to live
Best Short Stories of 1983 --- The Time is not yet ripe
Best Novellas of 1983-1984 --- Emerald (Zu Mulü)
2nd Mao Dun Literature Prize of 1985 --- Leaden Wings
6th Mao Dun Literature Prize of 2005 --- Without A World

Main works
 The Child of the Forest (Cong senlin li laide haizi) (1978)
 Love Must Not be Forgotten (1979)
 Leaden Wings (沉重的翅膀) (1981)
 The Ark (1982)
 On a Green Lawn (1983)
 Emerald (1984)
 If Nothing Happens, Nothing Will (1986)
 Only One Sun (1988)
 As Long As Nothing Happens, Nothing Will''' (translated short stories, 1988)
 A Chinese Woman in Europe (1989)
 You are a Friend of my Soul (1990)
 Fever (Shang Huo) (1991)
 Interior Heat (1992)
 In the Twilight (1994)
 The Person Who loved me the most on earth is gone (Shijieshang zui teng wo de nage ren qu le) (1994)
 Why... in the First Place? (1994)
 A Collection of Proses (1995)
 Oversea Travels (1995)
 Without A Word (Wu Zi) (2002)

 Introduction of works 

 The Child of the Forest 
This was the first work of Zhang jie in 1978, which was a story that took place during the Cultural Revolution, it is a work of Scar literature. The Scar Literature was a literary phenomenon that dominated the literary scene in mainland China from the late 1970s to the early 1980s. The story describes a touching story about a student who traveled thousands of miles to take an examination in the Central Conservatory of Music in order to fulfill his teacher's wishes, this teacher is one of the most talented musician in that period. The protagonist, Sun Changning, is the son of a lumberjack. Although he lives in the forest, he has to  be branded with "Scars" during the Cultural Revolution. With this novel, Zhang Jie wants to express the belief that art is one of the things that can sustain the human spirit during the Cultural Revolution, but only if the belief in art is honest and not evil.

 Leaden Wings (沉重的翅膀) 
This novel can also be called as Heavy Wings for the different translations, this novel was awarded in the 2nd Mao Dun Literature Prize of 1985. The experience of Zhang Jie working in the First Ministry of Machinery Industry provided her with the inspiration and knowledge to write about this novel on the problems faced by the companies. Zhang Jie not only conveys people's reform ideals, but also describes the cruxes of the society with exquisite style. The "heavy" reformer she created belongs to the literary image of the deepening period of reform. The novel, with the theme of reform, revolves around the work and life of high-level cadres. On the one hand, it shows the contents of enterprise management and political thought of the Ministry of Heavy Industry in China, and focuses on the efforts of several reformers. On the other hand, it also shows the family life of different characters. Through the description of their life, it reflects Zhang Jie's thinking on marriage.

 Without A Word (Wu Zi) 
Love is one of the major themes in Wu Zi. Zhang Jie uses interspersion technique to integrate the description of the Times with the personal life experiences of a female writer called Wu Wei, describes the marriage story of Wu Wei and several generations of women in her family. The context of this book is based on a time of upheaval and big change in China. It expresses women's realistic demands for love, marriage and family freedom at different stages in the new era, and shows the arduous and difficult course of women's liberation. This novel is the second time that Zhang Jie has won the 6th Mao Dun Literature Prize after Leaden Wings. Zhang Jie tried to use the emotional experience of several generations in this novel to break the shackles of Chinese women, but she found that everything was in vain. Women were giving everything to fight with love, but the tragic fate could not change.

 Love Must Not Be Forgotten 
This short story showed the topic of what Zhang jie is mainly woking on, "Love", and unraveled the tragedy of Zhong Yu and the old cadre's "lovers cannot be married" through the memories of her mother by a 30-year-old unmarried young woman named Shan Shan. This story shows two types of love at the same time, one is the love between the daughter and her mother, the other one is the love story of mother and a senior official in the Communist Party of who her mother had always loved. Zhong Yu wrote down her infinite affection for this man in her notebook called "Love, is not to forget". The obstacle in their love was that the man, out of gratitude and duty, married the fiancée of his fellow soldier who gave his life to protect the senior official.

 The Ark (方舟) 
This novel advocats that men and women should first have social equality, is Zhang Jie's most personal characteristic works. The novel describes three high school classmates, after a long and bumpy life, in order to get rid of the pain of reality, and respectively leave their husbands to get together in a residential unit, they called this resident the "Ark", to seek temporary shelter. The three women are all highly educated and intelligent women who are not respected in their marriage, and being biased by neighbors because divorce or separation, yet they also have difficulties mainly on facing hostility and abuse at work. . Through realism, it expresses the anxiety, loneliness and desolation of modern intellectual women's life path and spiritual pursuit.

Further reading
 Bloomsbury Guide to Women's LiteratureWho Knows how to live in 1979Screenplays of Zhang Jie's novels"ZhangJie zhuzuo xinian," Zhangjie yanjiu zhuanji'', by He Huoren

References

External links
 The Life and Literature of Zhang Jie
 Zhang Jie bibliography at Asian and Pacific Writers Network

1937 births
2022 deaths
20th-century Chinese short story writers
20th-century Chinese women writers
21st-century Chinese women writers
21st-century Chinese writers
Chinese feminists
Short story writers from Beijing
Chen Bochui Children's Literature Award winners
Mao Dun Literature Prize laureates
Chinese women novelists
Chinese women short story writers
People's Republic of China short story writers
People's Republic of China novelists